Li Wenmei (born 2 November 1999) is a Chinese badminton player from Maoping, Hubei. She began to play badminton at the age of seven and entered the Hubei team training centre in June 2010 as the singles player. She was selected to join the second team of Hubei province, who was trained by the former World Champion, Wei Yili, in April 2013. She represented Hubei province competed at the 2017 National Games of China in Tianjin, helps the team as the first singles and second doubles player achieved their best record for 42 years history by winning the silver medal at the Games. Li was part of the national junior team that won the gold medal at the 2017 World Junior Championships, and also claimed the bronze medals in the girls' and mixed doubles event. She won her first senior international title at the BWF Super 500 tournament 2020 Malaysia Masters partnered with Zheng Yu.

Achievements

Asian Championships 
Women's doubles

World Junior Championships 
Girls' doubles

Mixed' doubles

BWF World Tour (1 title, 2 runners-up) 
The BWF World Tour, which was announced on 19 March 2017 and implemented in 2018, is a series of elite badminton tournaments sanctioned by the Badminton World Federation (BWF). The BWF World Tour is divided into levels of World Tour Finals, Super 1000, Super 750, Super 500, Super 300 (part of the HSBC World Tour), and the BWF Tour Super 100.

Women's doubles

References

External links 
 

1999 births
Living people
Badminton players from Hubei
Chinese female badminton players